The 1990 Stanley Cup Finals was the championship series of the National Hockey League's (NHL) 1989–90 season, and the culmination of the 1990 Stanley Cup playoffs. It was contested by the Edmonton Oilers and the Boston Bruins; the Oilers won, four games to one. The series was a rematch of the 1988 Finals, albeit with the notable absence of Wayne Gretzky who was traded from Edmonton to the Los Angeles Kings during the 1988 off-season. For the Oilers, it was their fifth Cup win in seven years, and the team's only championship after trading Gretzky. This was the last of eight consecutive Finals contested by a team from Alberta and nine by a team from Western Canada (the Oilers appeared in six, the Calgary Flames in two, the Vancouver Canucks in one).

Paths to the Finals

Boston defeated the Hartford Whalers 4–3, the Montreal Canadiens 4–1 and the Washington Capitals 4–0 to advance to the Final.

Edmonton defeated the Winnipeg Jets 4–3, the Los Angeles Kings 4–0 and the Chicago Blackhawks 4–2.

Game summaries

Though the Oilers ultimately won the series in five games, it was the Bruins who dominated play during the early part of the series. The Bruins had more chances to win the opener, and at one point had a 15-4 shot advantage in game two before the Oilers came back.

In game five at the Boston Garden on May 24, the Oilers won 4–1, the first time they had ever clinched the Cup on the road. Edmonton won all three Finals games played at Boston Garden - in each their previous Finals wins, the Oilers only won one game away from Northlands Coliseum. Craig Simpson scored the game-winning goal. Oilers goaltender Bill Ranford, originally the backup who took over from Grant Fuhr for the remainder of the regular season and the entire playoffs, was awarded the Conn Smythe Trophy as playoff MVP.

Mark Messier won his first Stanley Cup as a team captain, and his fifth overall. He won his sixth Stanley Cup as the captain with the New York Rangers four years later, and scored the Cup-winning goal, making him the only player to captain two different Cup-winning teams.

The Oilers did not reach the Finals again until , losing in seven games.

Boston Bruins vs. Edmonton Oilers

Team rosters
Years indicated in boldface under the "Finals appearance" column signify that the player won the Stanley Cup in the given year.

Boston Bruins

Edmonton Oilers

Stanley Cup engraving
The 1990 Stanley Cup was presented to Oilers captain Mark Messier by NHL President John Ziegler following the Oilers 4–1 win over the Bruins in game five.

The following Oilers players and staff had their names engraved on the Stanley Cup

1989–90 Edmonton Oilers

Stanley Cup engravings
Garnet "Ace" Bailey won seven Stanley Cups. His name was engraved on the Stanley Cup five times. He was engraved as Garnet Bailey in 1972, G. Bailey in 1970, 1985, 1987, and Ace Bailey in 1990. His name was left off the Stanley Cup, but he was awarded Stanley Cup rings in 1984, 1988.
 #29 Vladimir Ruzicka (C/LW) joined Edmonton from Europe in January. Ruzicka played 25 games, but did not dress in the playoffs. 
 #19 Anatoli Semenov (RW) joined Edmonton from Europe in May. Semenov played two games in the Conference Final.
Neither player qualified for engravement on the Cup, but both players received Stanley Cup rings. Ruzicka was also included on the team winning picture.
Grant Fuhr only played 21 games during the regular season due to injuries. Although he would miss the rest of the regular season and the entire playoffs, he qualified to be on the Cup by dressing for over 40 regular season games.

Members of all five Edmonton Oilers championships
Glenn Anderson, Grant Fuhr, Randy Gregg, Charlie Huddy, Jari Kurri, Kevin Lowe, Mark Messier (seven Players), Peter Pocklington, Glen Sather, John Mucker, Ted Green, Barry Fraser, Barry Stafford, Lyle Kulchisky (seven non-players)
Nine non-players were part of all five championships, but not all engraved each year: Garnet 'Ace' Bailey, Ed Chadwick, Lorne Davis, Matti Vaisanen, Gordon Cameron, Bill Tuele, John Backwell, Werner Baum, and Bob Freedman

Members of all five Edmonton Oilers championships and New York Rangers championship (1994)
Glenn Anderson, Kevin Lowe and Mark Messier.

Broadcasting
In Canada, the series was televised on the CBC.

In the United States, the series aired nationally on SportsChannel America. However, SportsChannel America's national coverage was blacked out in the Boston area due to the local rights to Bruins games in that TV market. NESN televised games one, two, and five in the Boston area while WSBK had games three and four.

See also
 1989–90 NHL season
 List of Stanley Cup champions
 1989–90 Boston Bruins season
 1989–90 Edmonton Oilers season

References
Inline citations

Bibliography

 
Stan
Stanley Cup Finals
Boston Bruins games
Edmonton Oilers games
Ice hockey competitions in Boston
Ice hockey competitions in Edmonton
Stanley Cup Finals
Stanley Cup Finals
Stanley Cup Finals
1990s in Edmonton